"Slow Dancing in a Burning Room" is a song by John Mayer from the 2006 album Continuum. Although it was not one of the singles released from the album, it is widely regarded as one of Mayer's best songs, and has become one of his most commercially successful tracks. The song reached #10 as its highest radio airplay position in Indonesia.

Reviews
The song has been positively reviewed; Stereogum describes it as "laced with Clapton-esque guitar lines". and Crypticrock describes it as "emotionally driven and with an impassioned guitar solo which is sultry and somber and lends perfectly to the image of a dying relationship". The Daily Evergreen described "Slow Dancing in a Burning Room" as Continuum'''s masterpiece, with an impeccable guitar solo.

"Slow Dancing in a Burning Room" is regarded as Mayer's best song by Billboard, as his fourth-best song by Blues Rock Review and his second-best song by Marie Claire.

Commercial performance
Despite never having been released as a single, the song has been certified platinum in the United States, silver in the UK and gold in Denmark.

Released versions
The song was also released in an acoustic version on the EP The Village Sessions and on the live album Where the Light Is: John Mayer Live in Los Angeles. The official Vevo video, however, uses the live version of the song from the online concert series Live on Letterman''.

Cover versions
K-pop singer Rosé covered the song live in 2021; Mayer stated he found the interpretation "gorgeous".

References

John Mayer songs
2006 songs
Songs written by John Mayer